Anthony David Hall (born 17 January 1969) is an English former footballer who played as a central defender in the Football League for Tranmere Rovers and Hartlepool United.

References

1969 births
Living people
People from Billingham
Footballers from County Durham
Association football central defenders
English footballers
Billingham Town F.C. players
Tranmere Rovers F.C. players
Hartlepool United F.C. players
East Fife F.C. players
Gateshead F.C. players
Berwick Rangers F.C. players
Ballymena United F.C. players
Waterford F.C. players
Kilkenny City A.F.C. players
English Football League players
Scottish Football League players
League of Ireland players
National League (English football) players
Northern Premier League players